Tom Symoens (born 7 July 1969) is a Belgian rower. He competed at the 1992 Summer Olympics and the 1996 Summer Olympics.

References

External links
 

1969 births
Living people
Belgian male rowers
Olympic rowers of Belgium
Rowers at the 1992 Summer Olympics
Rowers at the 1996 Summer Olympics
Sportspeople from Bruges
20th-century Belgian people